Caldera del Atuel is a caldera in Argentina. Cerro Sosneado is a volcano (best volume estimate ) located outside of the Atuel caldera, Volcan Overo (best volume estimate ) and Las Lágrimas complex are located within the caldera. Holocene activity may have formed the cinder cones on the northeastern side of the caldera. After the 2010 Maule earthquake, the caldera was one of the volcanic centres that underwent subsidence, along with secondary earthquake activity.

See also
List of volcanoes in Argentina

References
 

Mountains of Argentina
Volcanoes of Mendoza Province
Calderas of Argentina
Polygenetic volcanoes
Five-thousanders of the Andes
Quaternary calderas